Alwin Oswald Nurse aka NEGUS (born 18 January 1982) is a Guyanese reggae dancehall recording artist, composer, singer/songwriter, record producer,  tattoo artiste, entrepreneur, and owner of Madd Art Tattoo shop in Toronto. He is a father of 2 boys. Has eight (8) siblings with six sisters and two brothers and grew up in the depressed and crime ridden community of Middle Road / Alboustown, Guyana, where he learned to overcome significant hardships as a 'ghetto youth', and spent some time in his early years living in Suriname recognizing that music was his only way out.

Background
At a very early age, Alwin would be exposed to music from his musically inclined parents. He would be in and out of music studios at the age of 3 with his father Kenneth Nurse aka "Small Man", who was the manager and recording artiste for a popular Guyanese music band late 90's called the Mingles Sound Machine, credited for playing the role of Bob Marley in a tribute event.

Alwin would leave Guyana in 1990 for Trinidad and Tobago at the age of 8 to join his mother, songwriter Sabrina Waddle who had migrated and lived in Port of Spain and sent for him. He attended primary level education and interchangeably travelled between Guyana and Trinidad, living in both locations for various periods of time, attending private secondary school in Guyana.

As he got older, he started working at Signature Selection in Macoya, Trinidad as a handyman for Mr and Mrs Nat. During this time he would meet a number of artistes such as Oscar B, Leon Coldero), (Iwer George) and Bunji Garlin where he became inspired to pursue a professional career in reggae/dancehall music. In the year 2003 at the age of twenty-one (21) Alwin decided to migrate to Canada to begin working on establishing his music career.

Career
Alwin's music career started from a very young age, as he shared the stage with well known Jamaican artists like Beenie Man, Buju Banton, Mr. Vegas, Red Rat and many others as a teenager. In 2012, he would collaborate with Konshens releasing his first track “Dah Wine Deh”. This grew into starting up his own label Street Platinum Records, where he produced music for top artiste events for musicians like Tommy Lee Sparta, Sikka Rymes, Jahvillani, Kalado and Navino.

References

External links
Apple Music Artiste Profile
Negus Official Website

1982 births
Living people
Guyanese reggae musicians
Guyanese reggae singers
Guyanese male singers
Guyanese people of Canadian descent
People from Georgetown, Guyana
Reggae fusion artists
21st-century male singers